Jonathan Stephen Geoffrey King (born 21 May 1948), known professionally as Jonathan "Nash" Hyde, is an Australian-English actor. Hyde is perhaps best known for roles as Herbert Arthur Runcible Cadbury in the 1994 comedy film Richie Rich, Samuel Parrish and Van Pelt in the 1995 fantasy adventure film Jumanji, J. Bruce Ismay in the 1997 epic romantic film Titanic, Culverton Smith in The Memoirs of Sherlock Holmes, Warren Westridge in creature feature film Anaconda, Dr. Allen Chamberlain in the 1999 adventure horror film The Mummy, and Eldritch Palmer in the FX TV series The Strain. Although an Australian citizen, he has mostly lived in the United Kingdom since 1969, after his family left Australia.

Early life
Hyde was born in Brisbane, Queensland, to a middle-class family. His father was Stephen Geoffrey King, a solicitor. Hyde's interest in law took him to university to study the subject but his passion for performing and the theatre led him to pursue a career in acting. Leaving for London in 1969, he was awarded a coveted place at the Royal Academy of Dramatic Art and won the Bancroft Gold Medal for excellence in his graduating year of 1972. In a 2007 interview with The Age, Hyde said he did not make a conscious decision to lose his Australian accent after moving to Britain, and that it still "comes and goes."

Career
Hyde is a member of the Royal Shakespeare Company. Among other roles, he played Ferdinand in a 1985 production of John Webster's The Duchess of Malfi. He was an original cast member of Not the Nine O'Clock News, the first series of which was pulled from broadcast because of the General Election of 1979. Hyde played J. Bruce Ismay, the managing director of the White Star Line in Titanic, Egyptologist Allen Chamberlain in The Mummy, and Sam Parrish/Van Pelt, the hunter in Jumanji. He has been in numerous films including The Contract, The Curse of King Tut's Tomb, Land of the Blind, The Tailor of Panama, Sherlock Holmes and the Case of the Silk Stocking, Eisenstein and Anaconda.

He appeared in the 1989 BBC miniseries Shadow of the Noose in which he played barrister Edward Marshall Hall. He has also appeared in several television mysteries, including The Adventures of Sherlock Holmes starring Jeremy Brett in which Hyde played Culverton Smith and Midsomer Murders as Frank Smythe-Webster.

In 2007, Hyde played Dr. Dorn in Chekhov's The Seagull and the Earl of Kent in King Lear for the Royal Shakespeare Company in a repertory company that included Ian McKellen, Frances Barber, Romola Garai, William Gaunt and Sylvester McCoy. Both plays toured together internationally, before taking up residence in the New London Theatre. The final performance was on 12 January 2008. He reprised his role of Kent in the 2008 television film of King Lear.

In the final series of BBC's popular series Spooks, Hyde played Ilya Gavrik, a Russian Minister.

Hyde appeared as Lionel Logue, the King's speech therapist in the West End production of The King's Speech at Wyndham's Theatre.

From 2014 to 2017, he starred as Eldritch Palmer in the FX TV series The Strain.

Personal life
Hyde married Scottish soprano Isobel Buchanan in 1980. They have two daughters, one of whom is actress Georgia King.

Filmography

Theatre work

With the Glasgow Citizens' Theatre

With the Royal Shakespeare Company
First Season (1980/81)
Mercutio in Romeo and Juliet (Ron Daniels, RST, Aldwych)
Second Season (1982/83)
Edgar in the Michael Gambon King Lear (Adrian Noble, RST, Barbican)
Octavius in the Gambon/Helen Mirren Antony and Cleopatra (TOP, Pit)
Oliver in As You Like It (Terry Hands, RST, 1980, Aldwych, 1981)
Richmond in Richard III (Hands, RST, 1980, Aldwych, 1981)
Aumerle in Richard II (Hands, RST, 1980, Aldwych, 1981)
Tom Nightwork in The Swan Down Gloves (Ian Judge/Hands, RST, 1981, Aldwych, 1981–82)
Bassanio in The Merchant of Venice (John Barton, RST, Aldwych, 1981)
the Porter in Macbeth (Howard Davies, RST, 1982, Barbican, 1983)
Laxton in The Roaring Girl (Barry Kyle, Barbican, 1983).

Return to Stratford as Associate Artist
Vasques in 'Tis Pity She's a Whore (David Leveaux, Swan, 1991)
Face in The Alchemist (Sam Mendes, Swan)
Brutus in Julius Caesar (Steven Pimlott, RST)
Columbus in Richard Nelson's Columbus and the Discovery of Japan (John Caird, Barbican, 1992)
Kent in King Lear and Dorn in The Seagull (Trevor Nunn, Courtyard and International Tour, 2007).

Other theatre work
Ferdinand in The Duchess of Malfi (Philip Prowse, NT Lyttelton, 1985)
Muldoon in The Real Inspector Hound (Tom Stoppard, NT Olivier, 1985)
Mr Sneer in The Critic (Sheila Hancock, NT Olivier, 1985)
Yasha in The Cherry Orchard (Mike Alfreds, NT Cottesloe, 1985)
Valmont in Christopher Hampton's Les liaisons dangereuses (Davies, Ambassadors, 1987)
the Doge of Venice in Howard Barker's Scenes from an Execution (Ian McDiarmid, Almeida, 1990)
the Count in Anouilh's The Rehearsal (McDiarmid, Almeida, 1990)
Charles in Hanif Kureishi's Sleep With Me (NT Cottesloe, 1999)
Creon opposite Tara Fitzgerald in Sophocles's Antigone (Declan Donnellan, Old Vic, 1999)
Archie in Stoppard's Jumpers (David Leveaux, NT Lyttelton, 2003).
Captain Hook in Peter Pan (Three Sixty Entertainment) (Neverland Pavilion in Kensington Gardens, 2009).
Isaac Newton ( BBC Docu-Drama).
Julius Caesar in Julius Caesar (Robert Hastie, Crucible Theatre, 2017)
Richard Nixon in Frost/Nixon (Kate Hewitt, Crucible Theatre, 2018) 
Claudius in Hamlet  (Sean Mathias, Theatre Royal Windsor, 2021)

References

External links
 
 
 

1948 births
Alumni of RADA
Australian emigrants to England
Australian male film actors
Australian male stage actors
Australian male television actors
Australian expatriates in England
English male film actors
English male stage actors
English male television actors
Living people
Royal Shakespeare Company members
Actors from Queensland